As Long as I'm Singing: The Bobby Darin Collection is a four-disc box set, released in 1995 by Rhino.

Critical reception

Richie Unterberger begins his AllMusic review with "A four-CD box set spanning several styles, labels, and eras, this will stand as the most thorough retrospective of Darin's eclectic career, though not necessarily the best." He goes on to give 4½ stars out of a possible 5.

Robert Hilburn of the Los Angeles Times calls this box set an "excellent four-disc survey of Darin’s remarkably varied career." He rates the box set 4 out of 4 stars.

Chad Jones of the East Bay Times says this compilation is "By far the most comprehensive overview of Darin’s multi-faceted career."

Shane Brown of The Elvis Forum writes "This 4CD set from Rhino was released over twenty years ago, and yet still holds a special place in most fan's hearts." He rates the box set a 10 out of a possible 10.

See original reviews for full articles. Links can be found in the references section of this article.

Track listing

Track information and credits taken from the album's liner notes.

References

External links
Bobby Darin Official Site
Rhino Records Official Site

1995 compilation albums
Rhino Records compilation albums